The Hosseini infancy conference (Persian: همایش شیرخوارگان حسینی hamâyeš-e širxwargan-e Hōsēynī) is a mourning custom of the Day of Ashura. It is held on the first Friday of Muharram in the Islamic calendar to commemorate the memory of Ali al-Asghar ibn Husayn, the six-month-old baby boy of Husayn ibn Ali and Umm Rubab, who was the youngest person killed in the Battle of Karbala.

Aim of the conference 
According to a report by Islamic Republic of Iran Broadcasting, the aim of holding the Hosseini infancy conference is to promote the teaching of Ashura.

Time and place 
The first conference was held in 2003, and after that mourners have congregated every year on the first Friday of Muharram throughout Iran and in 43 other countries including Iraq, Pakistan, Bahrain, India, and Turkey.

The 2018 Hosseini infancy conference is being held in Musalla, Tehran and other cities such as Mashhad, Alborz, Khorramabad, and Qom in the Jamkaran mosque.

Clothing 
 
At the conference, mothers dress their babies in special green and white clothes, which are said to resemble the clothing of Ali al-Asghar ibn Husayn. Babies also wear a headband with the name of Ali al-Asghar ibn Husayn written on it.

Places
Each first Friday of Muharram in Iran and other countries, mothers and their babies receive Alavi's green gown and scarf and the forehead band of Ya Sahebazzaman upon their arrival in the conference. They will then mourn Ali Asghar's infant death at Karbala. In 2003, the first ceremony was held in Tehran. Other cities of Iran and other countries have been holding the ceremony ever since.

 2003: Tehran (the first year)
 2004: Tehran, Mashhad, Qom, Karbala, Najaf, Bahrain
 2005: 54 cities of Iran and 21 cities elsewhere
 2006: 112 cities of Iran and 30 cities elsewhere
 2007: 213 cities of Iran and 43 cities elsewhere
 2008: 400 cities of Iran and 59 cities elsewhere
 2009: 550 cities of Iran and 70 cities elsewhere
 2010: 970 points of Iran and 87 cities elsewhere
 2011: 1550 points of Iran and 110 cities in the five continents
 2011: 2000 points of Iran and 220 cities in the five continents
 2012: 2050 points of Iran and 222 cities in the five continents
 2013: 2075 points of Iran and 225 cities in the five continents
 2014: 2500 points of Iran and 230 cities in the five continents

Countries 

The ceremony is held in these countries:
 Iraq
 Bahrain
 Turkey
 Lebanon
 Saudi Arabia
 Pakistan
 India
 Afghanistan
 United Arab Emirates
 Oman
 Yemen
 Sudan
 England
 Germany
 Italy

In the Gregorian calendar 
The following table shows the predicted dates and announced dates based on the calendar of Iran, which celebrated the conference for the first time.

Gallery

See also 
 List of casualties in Husayn's army at the Battle of Karbala
 Ayyam al-Beed
 Ehya night

References

External links 

 Global convent for respect Ali-e-Asghar honour website 
 Pictures of baby in Ali al-Asghar ibn Husayn’s cloth
 Pictures of Hosseini infancy conference in Mashhad 
 Pictures of Hosseini infancy conference in Alborz Provience

2003 establishments in Iran
Recurring events established in 2003
Mourning of Muharram
Murdered Asian children
Islamic terminology
Ceremonies in Iran
Annual events in Iran